Acrolophus pallidus is a moth of the family Acrolophidae. It is found in Suriname.

References

Moths described in 1881
pallidus